Gawn Ice Piedmont is an ice piedmont and snow slope occupying the coastal platform between Darwin Glacier and Byrd Glacier, Antarctica. It was named by the Darwin Glacier Party of the Commonwealth Trans-Antarctic Expedition (1956–58) for J.E. Gawn, a radio operator at Scott Base who worked closely with the field parties.

References

Ice piedmonts of Antarctica
Bodies of ice of the Ross Dependency
Hillary Coast